Andrew Fowler (born 9 December 1995) is a Guyanese swimmer. He competed in the 2020 Summer Olympics.

References

1995 births
Living people
Swimmers at the 2020 Summer Olympics
Guyanese male swimmers
Olympic swimmers of Guyana